The Northland Conference was an IHSAA-sanctioned conference in Northern Indiana. The conference formed in 1998 with six schools, and disbanded in 2008, after two schools left to join the Greater South Shore Conference.

History
The conference formed in 1998, when Westville left the Porter County Conference to join with four independents: Argos, Michigan City Marquette, Oregon-Davis and South Central (Union Mills), and River Forest, which previously competed in the defunct Northwest Hoosier Conference. South Central left for the Porter County Conference after the 2002–03 school year, and was replaced for the 2004–05 season by Elkhart Christian. The conference shrank to four members when Marquette and River Forest left to co-found the Greater South Shore Conference after the 2006–07 school year. Unable to find suitable replacements, the remaining schools decided to disband the conference after the 2007–08 school year.

Membership

Resources 
 IHSAA Conferences
 IHSAA Directory

Indiana high school athletic conferences
High school sports conferences and leagues in the United States
Indiana High School Athletic Association disestablished conferences